Asal Saparbaeva known as Littos (uzb: Asal Saparboeva, cycrillic: Асал Сапарбаева born February 7, 1994) is an uzbek former artistic gymnast and member of the national Olympic team of Uzbekistan. Bronze medalist of Asian Games in 2014 and at FIG World Cup in 2014 in Portugal. She has competed at the Asian Games 2010 2014, South Central Asian Gymnastics Championships  Dhaka 2011 and bronze medalist at the Artistic Gymnastics World Championships in 2014

Gymnastics career 
From the age of 5 to 21 she was professionally engaged in gymnastic. Since 2007 she has been a member of the national team of Uzbekistan. From that moment on, she began to travel abroad to major international competitions and represent her country.  multiple champion of Uzbekistan, bronze medalist of the Asian Games in China, Guangzhou in 2010, Champion of Central and South Asia Dhaka in 2011 and  bronze medalist of the World Cup in Portugal in 2014.

2010 Asian Games Guangzhou, China.

2011 4th Central South Asian Artistic Gymnastics Championships

2014 FIG Artistic Gymnastics World Cup

Personal life 
Asal Saparbaeva is married.

Education 

 2005-2013 Studied at the Republican College of Olympic Reserve
 2013 - 2017 Uzbek State Institute of Physical Culture

Degree

 Title: Master of Sports in International Class in artistic gymnastics

External links
  (original YouTube channel)

References 

1994 births
Living people
Medalists at the 2010 Asian Games
Asian Games bronze medalists for Uzbekistan
Olympic gymnasts of Uzbekistan
20th-century Uzbekistani women
21st-century Uzbekistani women
Uzbekistani female artistic gymnasts